Mountain Run is a small tributary of the Rappahannock River, located in Virginia. It starts and ends within the borders of Culpeper County, emptying into the Rappahannock River, which makes up the northeastern board of the county. Two reservoirs, Mountain Run Lake and Pelham Reservoir, are fed by Mountain Run.

See also
List of rivers of Virginia

References

External links
Mountain Run (lake), Virginia Department of Game and Inland Fisheries

Rivers of Virginia
Tributaries of the Rappahannock River
Rivers of Culpeper County, Virginia